Big Boy Junction is an unincorporated community in Dyer County, Tennessee, United States.

One flood was so large that "sizable boats" were able to dock at Big Boy Junction.

A Tennessee Farmers Cooperative store is located in Big Boy Junction.

References

Unincorporated communities in Dyer County, Tennessee
Unincorporated communities in Tennessee